Kristo may refer to:

Given name

Surname
Borjana Krišto (born 1961), Bosnian Croat politician
Danny Kristo (born 1990), American hockey player

Other uses
 Kristo (1996 film)

See also

 Christo (disambiguation)
 Cristo (disambiguation)
 Krist
 Krista
 Kristi (disambiguation)
 Kristy